David Bissett may refer to:

David Bissett (bobsleigh) (born 1979), Canadian bobsledder
David Bissett (field hockey) (born 1949), Canadian field hockey player